"Danzai no Hana: Guilty Sky" (断罪の花: Guilty Sky, literally Conviction's Flower) is a single by Riyu Kosaka released on May 16, 2007. This is her third solo single. It was released as both a CD, and a CD+DVD. Danzai no Hana was used as one of the outro songs to the anime Claymore.

CD Side

 断罪の花: Guilty Sky (Danzai no Hana: Guilty Sky)
 Ignore
 Danzai no Hana: Guilty Sky [English version]
 断罪の花: Guilty Sky instrumental
 Ignore instrumental

DVD Side
断罪の花: Guilty Sky Music Clip
断罪の花: Guilty Sky "Claymore" Edit

Sources 
https://web.archive.org/web/20080702180206/http://bmf.i-revo.jp/beforu/disco.html
http://www.neowing.co.jp/detailview.html?KEY=AVCA-26298

Further reading

External links
 

2007 singles
Riyu Kosaka songs
2007 songs
Avex Trax singles